Portrait of Juan Pardo de Tavera  is a 1609 oil on canvas painting by El Greco, now in the Hospital de Tavera in Toledo, founded by the portrait's subject. It was painted long after the 1545 death of its subject, cardinal Juan Pardo de Tavera, and so the artist modelled the cardinal's features on a funerary mask by Alonso Berruguete.

Bibliography 
 ÁLVAREZ LOPERA, José, El Greco, Madrid, Arlanza, 2005, Biblioteca «Descubrir el Arte», (colección «Grandes maestros»). .
 SCHOLZ-HÄNSEL, Michael, El Greco, Colonia, Taschen, 2003. .

External links
ArteHistoria.com. «Cardenal Tavera». [Consulta: 09.01.2011].

1609 paintings
Tavera
Tavera
Tavera